Åke Borg (18 August 1901 – 6 June 1973) was a Swedish swimmer. Teaming with his twin brother Arne he won a bronze medal at the 1924 Olympics and two European championship medals in the 4×200 m freestyle relay.

References

1901 births
1973 deaths
Swimmers from Stockholm
Swimmers at the 1924 Summer Olympics
Olympic swimmers of Sweden
Olympic bronze medalists for Sweden
Swedish twins
Olympic bronze medalists in swimming
Swedish male freestyle swimmers
Twin sportspeople
European Aquatics Championships medalists in swimming
Stockholms KK swimmers
Medalists at the 1924 Summer Olympics
20th-century Swedish people